This is the list of singles that reached number one on the Cash Box Top 100 Singles chart in 1982, presented in chronological order.

See also
1982 in music
List of Hot 100 number-one singles of 1982 (U.S.)

References
http://members.aol.com/_ht_a/randypny4/cashbox/1982.html
http://www.cashboxmagazine.com/archives/80s_files/1982.html
https://web.archive.org/web/20060614052134/http://musicseek.info/no1hits/1982.htm

1982
1982 record charts
1982 in American music